The following artists have either been signed to the Sub Pop record label or had material released through them:

#

 10 Minute Warning
 5ive Style

A

 A Frames
 The Action Suits
The Afghan Whigs
 The Album Leaf
 All Night Radio
 Arlo
 Avi Buffalo

B

 Babes in Toyland
 Band of Horses
 Baptist Generals
 Bareminimum
 The Beach Boys ("I Just Wasn't Made for These Times" 7 inch promoting the Pet Sounds Sessions box, 1996)
 Beach House
 Beachwood Sparks
 Beat Happening
 Ben Sollee
 Best Kissers in the World
 Big Chief
 The Black Halos
 Billy Childish
 Blitzen Trapper
 Blood Circus
 The Blue Rags
 Bob's Burgers music albums
 Boyd Rice
 The Brunettes
 Built to Spill
 Bully

C

Chad VanGaalen
CSS (Cansei de Ser Sexy)
 Cat Butt
 The Catheters
 Chappaquiddick Skyline
 Cartel Madras
 Chai
 Chemistry Set (from Seattle, WA)
 Chixdiggit
 Chris and Carla
 clipping.
 Cocorosie
 Codeine
 Combustible Edison
 Comets on Fire
 Constantines
 Corridor
 Cosmic Psychos
 Courtney Fortune
Cullen Omori

D

Damien Jurado
Damon & Naomi
Daniel Martin Moore
David Cross
 Dead Moon
 Deaf Wish
 Death Cab for Cutie
 Death Vessel
 Debby Friday
 Deerhunter
 Dinosaur Jr
 Dickless
 Dntel
Downtown Boys
 Heather Duby
 Dum Dum Girls
 Dwarves

E

 Earth
 The Elected
 Elevator to Hell/Elevator Through
Eric Matthews
 Eric's Trip
 The Evil Tambourines
Eugene Mirman

F

 The Fartz
 The Fastbacks
 Finnigan's Baked
 Father John Misty
 Fleet Foxes
 Flight of the Conchords
 The Fluid
 Foals
 Forth Wanderers
Frankie Cosmos
 Frausdots
 Friends of Dean Martinez
 Fruit Bats
 Fugazi

G

 Gardener
 Gas Huffer
 Girl Trouble
 Gluecifer
GOAT
 The Go
 The Go! Team
The Gotobeds
 Godflesh
 godheadSilo
 The Gotobeds
 Grand Archives
 Green Magnet School
 Green River
 The Grifters
 The Gutter Twins

H

 Handsome Furs
 Hannah Jadagu
 The Hardship Post
 Hazel
 The Head and the Heart
 Hellacopters
 The Helio Sequence
 Helios Creed
 Heroic Doses
Heron Oblivion
 His Electro Blue Voice
 Hole
 Holopaw
 The Homesick
 Hot Hot Heat
 Hot Snakes
 Husky

I

 Iron & Wine

J
 J Mascis
 Jale
 Jennifer Gentle
 Jesca Hoop
 Jeremy Enigk
 The Jesus and Mary Chain
 Julia Jacklin
 Julie Doiron
 Jo Passed
 Jon Benjamin - Jazz Daredevil

K
 Kelley Stoltz
 King Tuff
 Kinski
 Kiwi Jr.
 Knife Fights
 Kyle Craft

L

 L7
 Lael Neale
 Lee Bains III and the Glory Fires
 The Legend!
 Lethal Dosage
 Jason Loewenstein
Loma
 Loney, Dear
 Looper
 Love as Laughter
 Love Battery
 Low
 Lubricated Goat
 Luluc
 LVL UP

M

 Man Man
Mark Lanegan
 Marika Hackman
Mass Gothic
 The Makers
 Male Bonding
 Metz
 Memoryhouse
 Michael Yonkers
 Migala
 Mike & The Melvins
 Mirel Wagner
Moaning
 Modest Mouse
 Mogwai
 Morgan Delt
 Mudhoney
 Murder City Devils

N 

 Nebula
 Nigel Quashie
 Nightcaps
 Niki & The Dove
 Nirvana
 No Age
 The Notwist

O

 Obits
 OHMME
 Om
 Orville Peck
 Oxford Collapse

P

Patton Oswalt
 Papercuts
 Pedro the Lion
 Pernice Brothers
 Pigeonhed
 Pigface
 Pissed Jeans
 Pleasure Forever
 Plexi
 Poison 13
 Pond
 Porter Ray
 The Postal Service
 Preservation Hall Jazz Band

Q

 Quasi

R

 Radio Birdman
 Rapeman
 The Rapture
 Red House Painters
 Red Red Meat
 Reid Paley
 Rein Sanction
 The Reverend Horton Heat
 Rick and Morty
 Rolling Blackouts Coastal Fever
 Rogue Wave
 Rosie Thomas
 The Ruby Suns

S

 S*M*A*S*H
 Saint Etienne
 Thee Satisfaction
 Screaming Trees
 Scud Mountain Boys
 Seaweed
 Sebadoh
 Sera Cahoone
 Shabazz Palaces
 Shearwater
 Shiner
 The Shins
 Sick and Wrong
 Six Finger Satellite
 Sleater-Kinney
 The Smashing Pumpkins ("Tristessa" 7 & 12 inch, 1990)
 Sonic Youth
So Pitted
 Soul-Junk
 Soundgarden
 The Spinanes
 Spoek Mathambo
 Sprinkler
 Still Corners
 Steve Fisk
 Steven Jesse Bernstein
 Sunny Day Real Estate
 The Supersuckers
 Swallow

T

 TAD
 Tacocat
 Tall Birds
 Ten Minute Warning
 Thomas Andrew Doyle
 Thee Headcoats
 The Homesick
 The Thermals
 Thornetta Davis
 The Thrown Ups
 THUMPERS
 Les Thugs
 Tiny Vipers
 Total Control
 Trembling Blue Stars
 Truly
 Turbonegro
 The Twilight Singers
 The Tyde

U

 Ugly Casanova
 U-Men

V

 Vaselines (The Way of the Vaselines compilation, 1992)
 Velocity Girl
 Vetiver
 Vue

W
 Walt Wagner
 The Walkabouts
 Washed Out
 Weyes Blood
 The White Stripes
 The Wipers
 Wolf Eyes
 Wolf Parade

Y

 The Yo-Yos
 Yuno

Z

 Zen Guerrilla
 Zumpano

References

Sub Pop